Zoë Black is an Australian violin player. She plays with Australian Chamber Orchestra and is a recitalist and soloist.

Black has worked extensively with pianist and composer Joe Chindamo. Together they were nominated for the 2014 and 2016 ARIA Awards for Best Classical Album for their albums Dido's Lament and The New Goldberg Variations.

In 2011 Chindamo, Black and friends (Daniel Farrugia, Philip Rex, Sarah Curro, Caroline Henbest and Josephine Vains) released Hush collection. Volume 11, Luminous : inspired by Mozart for the Hush project which supports children's hospitals around Australia.

Discography

Albums

Awards and nominations

ARIA Music Awards
The ARIA Music Awards are presented annually from 1987 by the Australian Recording Industry Association (ARIA). 

! 
|-
| 2014
| Dido's Lament (with Joe Chindamo)
| Best Classical Album
| 
|rowspan="2" | 
|-
| 2016
| The New Goldberg Variations (with Joe Chindamo)
| Best Classical Album
| 
|-

References 

Living people
Australian musicians
Year of birth missing (living people)
Australian classical violinists
21st-century classical violinists
Women classical violinists